The sixth and final season of American comedy television series Mike & Molly was ordered on March 12, 2015, by CBS. The season premiered on January 6, 2016, in the United States on CBS, and the finale aired on May 16, 2016. The season consisted of 13 episodes.

The season is produced by Chuck Lorre Productions and Warner Bros. Television, with series showrunner Al Higgins serving as executive producer along with Chuck Lorre. Despite good ratings, CBS only ordered 13 episodes and on January 12, 2016, it was announced that the series would be cancelled. The final episode aired on May 16, 2016.

The series focuses on the title characters Mike Biggs (Billy Gardell) and Molly Flynn (Melissa McCarthy), a couple who meet at an Overeaters Anonymous meeting in Chicago. After Molly, a primary-school teacher (changing career to author in season 4), invites police officer Mike to give a talk to her class, they begin dating. As of the end of season 2, the two are married. Mike and Molly live in the home of Molly's mother Joyce (Swoosie Kurtz) and sister Victoria (Katy Mixon). Joyce is married to widower Vince Moranto (Louis Mustillo). Mike is regularly kept company by his best friend and partner in the police force, Carl McMillan (Reno Wilson). Other prominent characters in the series include Mike's mother Peggy (Rondi Reed), and cafe worker/owner Samuel (Nyambi Nyambi).

Cast

Main
 Billy Gardell as Mike Biggs (13 episodes)
 Melissa McCarthy as Molly Flynn (13 episodes)
 Reno Wilson as Carl McMillan (13 episodes)
 Katy Mixon as Victoria Flynn (13 episodes)
 Nyambi Nyambi as Samuel/Babatunde (9 episodes)
 Rondi Reed as Peggy Biggs (8 episodes)
 Louis Mustillo as Vince Moranto (13 episodes)
 Swoosie Kurtz as Joyce Flynn (13 episodes)

Recurring and guest appearances

Cleo King as Rosetta McMillan 'Nana'
David Anthony Higgins as Harry
Casey Washington as Officer Ramirez
Eric Allan Kramer as Officer Seely
Joel Murray as Dr. Jeffries
Jack McGee as Officer Gronski
Jamie Denbo as Officer Stoltz
Jessica Chaffin as Allison
Wallace Langham as Robert
Juliette Goglia as Frannie
Jessy Hodges as Maura
Amy Farrington as Karen
Rose Abdoo as Madame Vianne
Vernee Watson as Blanche

Episodes

Ratings

Live and DVR ratings

References

External links
Episode recaps at CBS.com
List of Mike & Molly season 6 episodes at Internet Movie Database

Mike & Molly
2016 American television seasons